The 1943 Davidson Wildcats football team was an American football team that represented Davidson College during the 1943 college football season as a member of the Southern Conference. In their eighth year under head coach Gene McEver, the team compiled an overall record of 0–5, with a mark of 0–3 in conference play, and finished in last place in the SoCon.

Schedule

References

Davidson
Davidson Wildcats football seasons
College football winless seasons
Davidson Wildcats football